The following highways are numbered 506:

Costa Rica
 National Route 506

United States
Maryland
  Maryland Route 506

Territories
  Puerto Rico Highway 506